Kāṣāya are the robes of fully ordained Buddhist monks and nuns, named after a brown or saffron dye. In Sanskrit and Pali, these robes are also given the more general term cīvara, which references the robes without regard to color.

Origin and construction

Buddhist kāṣāya are said to have originated in ancient India as a set of robes for the devotees of Gautama Buddha. A notable variant has a pattern reminiscent of an Asian rice field. Original kāṣāya were constructed of discarded fabric. These were stitched together to form three rectangular pieces of cloth, which were then fitted over the body in a specific manner. Together they form the "triple robe," or ticīvara. The ticīvara is described more fully in the Theravāda Vinaya (Vin 1:94 289).

Antarvāsa (Antaravāsaka)
The antarvāsa is the inner robe covering the lower body. It is the undergarment that flows underneath the other layers of clothing. It has a large top, and almost entirely covers the torso. In representations of the Buddha, the bottom of the antarvāsa usually protrudes, and appears in the rough shape of a triangle. This garment is essentially a skirt, which was common enough as ancient menswear. When needed, its height could be adjusted so it did not hang as low as the ankles.

Uttarāsaṅga
A robe covering the upper body. It comes over the undergarment, or antarvāsa. In representations of the Buddha, the uttarāsaṅga rarely appears as the uppermost garment, since it is often covered by the outer robe, or saṃghāti.

Saṃghāti
The saṃghāti is a double layers robe of Bhikkhus or Bhikkhunis used as an outer cloak for various occasions. It comes over the upper robe, and the undergarment (antarvāsa). In representations of the Buddha, the saṃghāti is usually the most visible garment, with the undergarment or uttarāsaṅga protruding at the bottom. It is quite similar in shape to the Greek himation, and its shape and folds have been treated in Greek style in the Greco-Buddhist art of Gandhāra.

Additions
Other items that may have been worn with the triple robe were:
 a waist cloth, the kushalaka
 a buckled belt, the samakaksika

Indian Buddhism
In India, variations of the kāṣāya robe distinguished different types of monastics. These represented the different schools that they belonged to, and their robes ranged widely from red and ochre, to blue and black.

Between 148 and 170 CE, the Parthian monk An Shigao came to China and translated a work which describes the color of monastic robes used in five major Indian Buddhist sects, called Da Biqiu Sanqian Weiyi (Ch. 大比丘三千威儀). Another text translated at a later date, the Śāriputraparipṛcchā, contains a very similar passage corroborating this information, but the colors for the Sarvāstivāda and Dharmaguptaka sects are reversed.

In traditions of Tibetan Buddhism, which follow the Mūlasarvāstivāda Vinaya, red robes are regarded as characteristic of the Mūlasarvāstivādins.

According to Dudjom Jigdral Yeshe Dorje, the robes of fully ordained Mahāsāṃghika monastics were to be sewn out of more than seven but no more than twenty-three sections. The symbols sewn on the robes were the endless knot (Skt. śrīvatsa) and the conch (Skt. śaṅkha), two of the aṣṭamaṅgala, auspicious symbols in Buddhism.

Jiāshā in Chinese Buddhism

In Chinese Buddhism, the term jiasha was borrowed from the term kāṣāya. In China, the jiasha refers to a one-piece, patchworked rectangular fabric which is worn over a long one-piece, cross-collar robe known as zhiduo.

During the early period of Chinese Buddhism, the most common color was red. Later, the color of the robes came to serve as a way to distinguish monastics, just as they did in India. However, the colors of a Chinese Buddhist monastic's robes often corresponded to their geographical region rather than to any specific schools. By the maturation of Chinese Buddhism, only the Dharmaguptaka ordination lineage was still in use, and therefore the color of robes served no useful purpose as a designation for sects, the way that it had in India.

During the Tang dynasty, Chinese Buddhist monastics typically wore grayish-black robes, and were even colloquially referred to as Ziyi, "those of the black robes." However, the Song dynasty monk Zanning (919–1001 CE) writes that during the earlier Han-Wei period, the Chinese monks typically wore red.

Kesa in Japanese Buddhism
The Japanese term kesa came from the Chinese transliteration of the term kāṣāya. Like in China, the kesa is a rectangular garment which is worn over the left shoulder. The Japanese kesa are also made of patchwork (割截衣; kassetsue) which can be composed of five, seven, nine, or more panels of fabric sewed together. The kesa is worn over a Chinese-style long robe, called jikitotsu (直裰) which was also developed in China, and had a belt or sash tied at the waist. Zen Buddhist monks wear a form of formal dress which is composed of two kimono, covered by the jikitotsu; and the kesa is finally worn on top of the jikitotsu.

Japanese buddhism kesa (袈裟) had used to be worn covering the entire body beneath the head, including both shoulders, but now it is worn with the right shoulder exposed, except in special cases. This is to show the worship and reverence for Buddha, as opposed to the ones worn by Tathāgata covering both shoulders.

See also 

 Zhiduo - Chinese Buddhist crossed-collar robe.
 Sang-kio-ki

Notes

References

Buddhist religious clothing
Chinese traditional clothing
Japanese full-body garments
Sri Lankan clothing